Somebody Up There Likes Me is a 1956 American drama film directed by Robert Wise and starring Paul Newman and Pier Angeli, based on the life of middleweight boxing legend Rocky Graziano.  The supporting cast features Everett Sloane, Eileen Heckart, Harold J. Stone, Sal Mineo, and Robert Loggia. Steve McQueen has a brief unbilled speaking role as Fidel.

The film was nominated for three Academy Awards, and won two: Best Cinematography (Black and White) (Joseph Ruttenberg) and Best Art Direction (Black and White) (Cedric Gibbons, Malcolm Brown, Edwin B. Willis, F. Keogh Gleason). It lost its nomination for Best Film Editing to Around the World in 80 Days.

Plot
Rocky Graziano (Paul Newman) has a difficult childhood and is beaten by his father. He joins a street gang, and undergoes a long history of criminal activities. He is sent to prison, where he is rebellious to all authority figures. After his release, he is drafted by the U.S. Army, but runs away. Needing money, he becomes a boxer, and finds that he has natural talent and wins six fights in a row before the Army finds him and dishonorably discharges him. He serves a year in a United States Disciplinary Barracks, and resumes his career as a boxer as a result.

While working his way to the title, he is introduced to his sister's friend Norma, whom he falls in love with and later marries. Starting a new, clean life, he rises to the top, but loses a title fight with Tony Zale (Court Shepard). A person he knew in prison finds him and blackmails him into throwing a fight over his dishonorable discharge. Rocky fakes an injury and avoids the fight altogether. When he is interrogated by the district attorney, he refuses to name the blackmailer and has his license suspended. His manager gets him a fight in Chicago to fight Zale the middleweight champion, once more. Rocky wins the fight.

Main cast

Production
The role of Rocky Graziano was originally to be played by James Dean, but he died before filming began, and Paul Newman was asked to take the part. Australian actor Rod Taylor was also considered for the part; although unsuccessful, his screen test impressed MGM enough for them to offer him a long term contract.

The film was also notable for being one of Paul Newman's first starring roles and for being one of the first films in which Steve McQueen appeared.  It also marked the film debuts of Frank Campanella, Robert Loggia, Angela Cartwright, and Dean Jones, all in uncredited bit parts.

Soundtrack

Perry Como's version of the title song is played over the opening and closing credits.

Box office
According to MGM records, the film earned $1,915,000 in the US and Canada and $1,445,000 elsewhere, resulting in a profit of $609,000.

Accolades
The film is recognized by American Film Institute in these lists:
 2006: AFI's 100 Years...100 Cheers – Nominated
 2008: AFI's 10 Top 10:	
 Nominated Sports Film

See also
 List of American films of 1956
 List of hood films

References

External links
 
 
 
 
 

1956 films
1956 drama films
1950s biographical drama films
1950s sports drama films
American biographical drama films
American black-and-white films
American boxing films
American sports drama films
Biographical films about sportspeople
Cultural depictions of boxers
1950s English-language films
Films based on autobiographies
Films directed by Robert Wise
Films scored by Bronisław Kaper
Films whose art director won the Best Art Direction Academy Award
Films whose cinematographer won the Best Cinematography Academy Award
Films with screenplays by Ernest Lehman
Metro-Goldwyn-Mayer films
Sports films based on actual events
1950s American films